Timothy M. Gallagher, O.M.V. is an American Roman Catholic priest and the Denver-based author of many bestselling books on the theology and spirituality of Ignatius of Loyola, and other themes of the spiritual life.  He served for twelve years in formation of seminarians, for ten years as provincial superior of his Catholic religious congregation, the Oblates of the Virgin Mary, and since 2000, has been dedicated to a ministry of writing, public speaking, retreats, digital events, and spiritual direction.

Biography
Timothy M. Gallagher was ordained to the priesthood in 1979 as a member of the Congregation of the Oblates of the Virgin Mary.  In 1983, he obtained his doctorate from The Pontifical Gregorian University, and became a spiritual director and retreat leader. He has taught at St. John's Seminary, Brighton, and Our Lady of Grace Seminary Residence, Boston, both in Massachusetts. In 2015, Father Gallagher accepted the St. Ignatius Chair for Spiritual Formation at St. John Vianney Theological Seminary in Denver. He has written over twenty books on spiritual themes, published articles in Catholic periodicals, appears frequently on Catholic television, and records many podcasts, radio interviews, series on YouTube, and virtual events used throughout the English-speaking Catholic world.

Writing
Since 2005, he has written a series of books on core topics in Ignatian spirituality, including discernment of spirits, discernment of God's will, discernment in the married vocation and in priesthood, the Examen prayer, contemplation and meditation.  The Examen Prayer, honored by the Catholic Press Association, was the first to appear on the national Catholic bestseller list.  The Discernment of Spirits was later made into a 26-part CatholicTV series. Subsequently, TV series were also produced on The Examen Prayer, Meditation and Contemplation, and Discerning the Will of God.

In 2013, Fr. Gallagher published a biography of the Venerable Bruno Lanteri entitled: Begin Again: The Life and Spiritual Legacy of Bruno Lanteri. This is his third book on the Venerable Lanteri, joining two others written in the 1980s. He has published two further books on Venerable Bruno Lanteri, Overcoming Spiritual Discouragement: the Wisdom and Spiritual Power of Venerable Bruno Lanteri (2019), and A Biblical Way of Praying the Mass: the Eucharistic Wisdom of Venerable Bruno Lanteri (2020). In 2016, Fr. Gallagher published a small, popular title about Venerable Bruno Lanteri via the Discerning Hearts ministry, containing spiritual counsels from his life and writings.

He has also written two books on the Liturgy of the Hours, Praying the Liturgy of the Hours: A Personal Experience (2014), and A Layman's Guide to the Liturgy of the Hours: How the Prayers of the Church Can Change Your Life (2019).

He has written further books for assistance in the spiritual life: When You Struggle in the Spiritual Life: An Ignatian Path to Freedom (2021) and Struggles in the Spiritual Life: Their Nature and Their Remedies (2022).

Many of his books are published in other languages, including Spanish, Portuguese, Korean, Polish, and Latvian.

Works

Ignatian titles on Discernment and Prayer

On Venerable Bruno Lanteri

On the Liturgy of the Hours

On Themes of the Spiritual Life

TV Series
Fr. Gallagher produced these broadcast conferences with EWTN.

 Liturgy of the Hours for Lay People
 Venerable Bruno's Spiritual Direction for Lay People
 Discerning the Will of God: A Guide to Catholic Decision Making
 Finding God in All Things: The Teaching of St. Ignatius on Prayer
 Living the Discerning Life: The Spiritual Teaching of St. Ignatius

Podcasts
Fr. Gallagher produced these podcasts with Discerning Hearts and OMV Productions.

 The Discernment of Spirits: Setting Captives Free (16 episodes)
 The Daily Examen (8 episodes)
 Meditation and Contemplation (7 episodes)
 The Discernment of God’s Will in Everyday Decisions (12 episodes)
 Praying the Liturgy of the Hours (8 episodes)
 Spiritual Desolation: Be Aware, Understand, Take Action (10 episodes)
 Begin Again: The Spiritual Legacy of Ven. Bruno Lanteri (18 episodes)
 A Lord of the Rings Spiritual Retreat (11 episodes)
 The Letters of St. Therese of Lisieux (13 episodes)
 Discerning the Will of God Seminar (8 episodes)
 Biblical Way of Praying the Mass (13 episodes)
 Spiritual Desolation (10 episodes)
 Contemplation to Attain the Love of God (2 episodes)
 Servant of God Leoni Martin (15 episodes)
 Overcoming Spiritual Discouragement (4 episodes)
  (16 episodes)

In 2022, the Hallow app published Fr. Gallagher's "Spiritual Exercises" in 28 parts.

References

External links 

Living people
American Roman Catholic priests
American Roman Catholic religious writers
Writers from Boston
Pontifical Gregorian University alumni
1953 births